The Negation is the third studio album by the death metal band Decapitated from Poland. It was released on 9 March 2004, through Earache Records.

It is Decapitated's final album to feature vocalist Wojciech "Sauron" Wąsowicz.

Critical reception

After its release, The Negation received mixed reviews from music critics. William York of AllMusic praised the production saying [...] is far better than on most of the big-name death metal albums released in the early 2000s. It's clear and full sounding, yet without being overly slick or digitally sanitized." While Jill Mikkelson of Exclaim! praised songwriting "All ten songs are delivered with debilitating momentum and quirky time changes, humiliating most contemporary metal outfits. Slower grooves paired with bludgeoning drumming create a crisp but exceptionally intense sound that has developed into their own."

Track listing

Personnel

Decapitated
 Wojciech "Sauron" Wąsowicz – vocals
 Wacław Kiełtyka – guitars
 Marcin "Martin" Rygiel – bass
 Witold Kiełtyka – drums

Production
 Sławek and Wojtek Wiesławski – production
 Decapitated – production
 Jacek Wiśniewski – cover art
 Darek Kempny – photography

References 

Decapitated (band) albums
2004 albums
Wicked World Records albums
Earache Records albums